Betty McGees Creek is a  long 2nd order tributary of the Uwharrie River, in Randolph County, North Carolina.

Variant names
According to the Geographic Names Information System, it has also been known historically as:  
Bellie McGees Creek
Bettie McGees Creek

Course
Betty McGees Creek rises on the Hannahs Creek divide in the Birkhead Mountains Wilderness about 6 miles northwest of Pisgah in Randolph County, North Carolina.  Betty McGees Creek then flows north and then curves southwest to meet the Uwharrie River about 5 miles northeast of New Hope.

Watershed
Betty McGees Creek drains  of area, receives about 46.9 in/year of precipitation, has a topographic wetness index of 348.09 and is about 79% forested.

See also
List of rivers of North Carolina

References

Rivers of North Carolina
Rivers of Randolph County, North Carolina